A. Rangaswami Iyengar (July 1877 – 4 February 1934) was an Indian journalist, lawyer and politician who served as a member of the Central Legislative Assembly and as the chief editor of The Hindu from 1928 till his death in 1934. He was a nephew of Kasturi Ranga Iyengar.

Early life 

Rangaswami Iyengar was born in the village of Erukathur near Tiruvarur in the then  Tanjore district in July 1877 to Narasimha Iyengar. He studied law in Madras. On completion of his studies, he practised as a lawyer in the Madras High Court.

Career 

When Kasturi Ranga Iyengar purchased The Hindu in 1905, he appointed Rangaswami Iyengar as an assistant editor. Rangaswami Iyengar served as assistant editor from 1905 to 1915, when he resigned to manage the affairs of its sister publication Swadesamitran. Rangaswami Iyengar joined the Swaraj Party and served as its General Secretary from 1925 to 1927.

Rangaswami was elected to the Central Legislative Assembly for two consecutive terms in 1923 and 1926. On S. Rangaswami Iyengar's death in 1926, Rangaswami Iyengar returned to The Hindu and served as its chief editor from 1928 to 1934. During his tenure as chief editor, Rangaswami Iyengar was one of the representatives at the Second Round Table Conference held in London in 1931.

Death 

Rangaswami Iyengar died in 1934. He was succeeded as chief editor of The Hindu by K. Srinivasan.

Works

Notes

External links 

 

19th-century Indian lawyers
1934 deaths
1877 births
People from Thanjavur district
Members of the Central Legislative Assembly of India
20th-century Indian lawyers
Journalists from Tamil Nadu
Lawyers in British India
Journalists in British India